Michael Edgar Adie,  (born 22 November 1929) was Bishop of Guildford from 1983 until his retirement in 1994.

He was born in Romford, Essex, the son of Walter Granville Adie and Kate Emily Adie (née Parrish), and educated at Westminster School and St John's College, Oxford. He is a distant relative of the broadcaster and journalist Kate Adie.

He was ordained in 1955 and after  a curacy at St Luke, Pallion, Sunderland he became Resident Chaplain to the Archbishop of Canterbury. After that he was Vicar of St Mark, Sheffield, Rural Dean of Hallam, Rector of Louth, and Archdeacon of Lincoln before being elevated to the episcopate.

Adie played a significant role in introducing the measure in General Synod that led to the ordination of women priests. He was Chairman of the General Synod Board of Education and was appointed a CBE in the 1994 Birthday Honours for services to education.

He was married in 1957 to Anne Devonald Roynon (b.1930- d. 2013); they had three daughters and one son.

Notes

1929 births
Living people
People from Romford
People educated at Westminster School, London
Alumni of St John's College, Oxford
Archdeacons of Lincoln
Bishops of Guildford
20th-century Church of England bishops
Commanders of the Order of the British Empire